The Théâtre des Funambules ('The Theatre of the Tightrope-Walkers') was a former theater located on the boulevard du Temple in Paris, sometimes called the Boulevard du Crime. It was located between the prominent Théâtre de la Gaîté, and the much smaller Théâtre des Délassements-Comiques.

Originally an informal venue for acrobatics and pantomime a theatre was eventually built in 1816. Originally seating 500, it was later enlarged to accommodate 773. The Funambules became celebrated for the performances of the 'Pierrot' mime Jean-Gaspard Deburau, between around 1819 and 1846, and also the early career of the great classical actor Frédérick Lemaître.

The theatre was demolished in 1862, along with other neighboring venues such as Théâtre de la Gaîté, during Haussmann's renovation of Paris.

Popular culture
The 1938 German film Dance on the Volcano featured Gustaf Gründgens as Jean-Gaspard Deburau. Marcel Carné set his 1945 French film Les Enfants du Paradis in the Théâtre des Funambules to evoke the atmosphere of the July Monarchy (1830–48), including the figures of Deburau and Lemaître among the main roles.

References

Sources
Encarta, accessed 16 August 2011
Hartnoll, Phyllis and Found, Peter (1996): Funambules, Théâtre des. The Concise Oxford Companion to the Theatre. Encyclopedia.com. (August 16, 2011). 

Other sources
Péricaud, Louis (1897): Le Théâtre des Funambules, ses mimes, ses acteurs et ses pantomimes, depuis sa fondation jusqu'à sa démolition

External links
 About the boulevard du Temple on Cosmovisions.com.

Former theatres in Paris
11th arrondissement of Paris
Theatres completed in 1816
Buildings and structures demolished in 1862
1816 establishments in France
Demolished buildings and structures in Paris